The American Board of Thoracic Surgery is an American surgical organization devoted to surgery of the chest.

References

External links 
Official website

Surgical organizations based in the United States
Thoracic surgery
Medical and health professional associations in Chicago